Filogia Ian "Filo" Tiatia (born 4 June 1971 in Wellington, New Zealand) is a New Zealand international rugby union footballer, best known as a back-row forward and occasional lock for Welsh region the Ospreys.

Tiatia made his debut for Wellington in 1992, playing through the advent of professionalism and then represented the Hurricanes in the Super 12 between 1996 and 2002.

Tiatia won 2 caps for the New Zealand national side in 2000. His first was as a replacement in a 102–0 win against Tonga where he scored a try. The next was a start at flanker against Italy where he again scored another try. match list

He then moved to Japan to play four seasons for Toyota Verblitz before signing for the Welsh region the Ospreys.

He became a cult figure at the Ospreys impressing fans with his all action style and appetite for work around the field. He played 99 times for the Ospreys scoring 10 tries. He was so popular at the Ospreys fans set up the Filo Tiatia Appreciation Society on Facebook . Tiatia also had a Grogg made of him in 2008 , and fought to keep Swansea Tennis Centre open in 2010 .

Tiatia retired at the age of 38 but stayed at the Ospreys as a coach. He was named head coach for the LV= Cup in 2011 

Filo Tiatia left his Ospreys coaching role at the end of the 2011–2012 season to become forwards coach at Japanese side Toyota Verblitz. 

After one season as forwards coach for Toyota Verblitz, Tiatia was promoted to head coach for the 2012 -13 season.

Tiatia was also involved with the Japanese national rugby team, under head coach Eddie Jones. He worked as a forwards coach during the 2013 Asian 5 Nations. Tiatia was later also involved with coaching the Japanese national team ahead of their November 2013 Test match against the All Blacks, which New Zealand won 54–6.

In September 2016 he became head coach of Japan's Sunwolves Super Rugby side

Tiatia's younger brother, Ace, has also played professional rugby at both provincial and Super Rugby levels, as well as making appearances for the Samoa national team.

References

External links
 
 Profile at OspreysRugby.com

1971 births
New Zealand international rugby union players
Expatriate rugby union players in Japan
People educated at Wellington College (New Zealand)
Living people
New Zealand rugby union coaches
New Zealand rugby union players
Wellington rugby union players
Hurricanes (rugby union) players
Toyota Verblitz players
Ospreys (rugby union) players
Rugby union flankers
Rugby union number eights
Expatriate rugby union players in Wales
New Zealand expatriate rugby union players
New Zealand expatriate sportspeople in Italy
Expatriate rugby union players in Italy
New Zealand expatriate sportspeople in Japan
New Zealand expatriate sportspeople in Wales